Lemmer is a German language surname. In Belgium, the name was first recorded in Antwerp, and some members of the Lemmer family became powerful and elevated to the ranks of nobility. The name may refer to:

Anton Lemmer (1871–1957), New Zealand musician
August Lemmer (1862–1952), German artist
Ivan Lemmer (born 1931), South African general
Ludwig Lemmer (1891–1983), German architect
Mark Lemmer (born 1967), British race car driver
 Shulem Lemmer (born 1990), American singer
Yaakov Lemmer (born 1983), American singer

See also 
Lemer (disambiguation)
Lemmer (disambiguation)

References 

German-language surnames
Jewish surnames